K-pop, short for Korean popular music, is a form of popular music originating in South Korea as part of South Korean culture.  It includes styles and genres from around the world, such as pop, hip hop, R&B, rock, jazz, gospel, reggae, electronic dance, folk, country, disco, and classical on top of its traditional Korean music roots. The term "K-pop" became popular in the 2000s, especially in the international context. The Korean term for domestic pop music is gayo, which is still widely used within South Korea.  While "K-pop" can refer to all popular music or pop music from South Korea, it is colloquially often used in a narrower sense for any Korean music and artists associated with the entertainment and idol industry in the country, regardless of the genre.

The more modern form of the genre, originally termed "rap dance", emerged with the formation of the hip hop boy band Seo Taiji and Boys, in 1992. Their experimentation with different styles and genres of music and integration of foreign musical elements helped reshape and modernize South Korea's contemporary music scene.

Modern K-pop "idol" culture began in the 1990s, as K-pop idol music grew into a subculture that amassed enormous fandoms of teenagers and young adults. After a slump in early idol music, from 2003, TVXQ and BoA started a new generation of K-pop idols that broke the music genre into the neighboring Japanese market and continue to popularize K-pop internationally today. With the advent of online social networking services and South Korean TV shows, the current spread of K-pop and South Korean entertainment, known as the Korean Wave, is seen not only in East Asia and Southeast Asia, but also in Pakistan, Bangladesh, India, Latin America, North Africa, Southern Africa and East Africa, the Middle East and throughout the Western world, gaining an international audience.

In 2018, K-pop experienced significant growth and became a "power player", marking a 17.9% increase in revenue growth. As of 2019, Korean popular music is ranked at number six among the top ten music markets worldwide according to the International Federation of the Phonographic Industry's "Global Music Report 2019", with BTS and Blackpink cited as artists leading the market growth. In 2020, K-pop experienced a record-breaking year when it experienced a 44.8% growth and positioned itself as the fastest-growing major market of the year.

Etymology 
The first known use of the term K-pop occurred on Billboard in the October 9, 1999 edition at the end of an article titled "S. Korea To Allow Some Japanese Live Acts" by Cho Hyun-jin, then a Korea correspondent for the magazine, which used it as a broad term for South Korean pop music. Cho himself, however, is not sure if he coined the term, since some articles stated that the word 'K-pop' was already being used by music industry insiders, even though he had never heard it personally.

Characteristics

Audiovisual content 
Although K-pop generally refers to South Korean popular music and the associated industry, some consider it to be an all-encompassing genre exhibiting a wide spectrum of musical and visual elements. The French Institut national de l'audiovisuel defines K-pop as a "fusion of synthesized music, sharp dance routines and fashionable, colorful outfits." Songs typically consist of one or a mixture of pop, rock, hip hop, R&B, and electronic music genres.

Systematic training of artists 

South Korean management agencies offer binding contracts to potential artists, sometimes at a young age. Trainees live together in a regulated environment and spend many hours a day learning how to sing, dance, speak foreign languages, and gain other skills in preparation for their debut. This "robotic" system of training is often criticized by Western media outlets. In 2012, The Wall Street Journal reported that the cost of training one Korean idol under SM Entertainment averaged US$3 million.

Hybrid genre and transnational values 

K-pop is a cultural product that features "values, identity and meanings that go beyond their strictly commercial value." It is characterized by a mixture of modern Western sounds and African-American influences (including sounds from Hip-hop, R&B, Jazz, black pop, soul, funk, techno, disco, house, and Afrobeats) with a Korean aspect of performance (including synchronized dance moves, formation changes and the so-called "point choreography" consisting of hooking and repetitive key movements). It has been remarked that there is a "vision of modernization" inherent in Korean pop culture. For some, the transnational values of K-pop are responsible for its success. A commentator at the University of California, San Diego has said that "contemporary Korean pop culture is built on ... transnational flows ... taking place across, beyond, and outside national and institutional boundaries." Some examples of the transnational values inherent in K-pop that may appeal to those from different ethnic, national, and religious backgrounds include a dedication to high-quality output and presentation of idols, as well as their work ethic and polite social demeanor, made possible by the training period.

Use of English phrases 

 
Modern K-pop is marked by its use of English phrases. Jin Dal Yong of Popular Music and Society  wrote that the usage may be influenced by "Korean-Americans and/or Koreans who studied in the U.S. [who] take full advantage of their English fluency and cultural resources that are not found commonly among those who were raised and educated in Korea." Korean pop music from singers or groups who are Korean-American such as Fly to the Sky, g.o.d, Rich, Yoo Seung-jun, and Drunken Tiger has both American style and English lyrics. These Korean-American singers' music has a different style from common Korean music, which attracts the interest of young people. Increasingly, foreign songwriters and producers are employed to work on songs for K-pop idols, such as will.i.am and Sean Garrett. Foreign musicians, including rappers such as Akon, Kanye West, Ludacris, and Snoop Dogg, have also featured on K-pop songs.

Entertainment companies help to expand K-pop to other parts of the world through a number of different methods. Singers need to use English since the companies want to occupy markets in the other parts of Asia, which enables them to open the Western market in the end. Most K-pop singers learn English because it is a common language in the world of music, but some singers also learn other foreign languages such as Japanese to approach the Japanese market. Similarly, increasing numbers of K-pop bands use English names rather than Korean ones. This allows songs and artists to be marketed to a wider audience around the world.

However, the use of English has not guaranteed the popularity of K-pop in the North American market. For some commentators, the reason for this is because the genre can be seen as a distilled version of Western music, making it difficult for K-pop to find acceptance in these markets. Furthermore, Western audiences tend to place emphasis on authenticity and individual expression in music, which the idol system can be seen as suppressing. 
According to Elaine W. Chun's research, even though hybridity appears more and more often in K-pop, and sometimes may even make fans admire K-pop stars more because it is fresh, new and interesting, it is hard to change those who believe in a perfect ideal for pure linguistic. This means that the original form of language is still difficult to alter.

Artist names, song titles, and lyrics have exhibited significant growth in the usage of English words. No singers in the top fifty charts in 1990 had English in their names: people who worked in the Korean music industry viewed using Korean names as standard. In 1995, most popular singers such as Kim Gun-mo, Park Mi-kyung, Park Jin-young, Lee Seung-chul, and Byun Jin-sub still used Korean names, but fourteen of the singers and groups in the top fifty used English names, including DJ DOC, 015B, Piano, and Solid. After the 1997 financial crisis, the government stopped censoring English lyrics and Korea started to have a boom in English. Since the late 1990s, English usage in singers' names, song titles, and lyrics has grown quickly. Seventeen singers in the top fifty charts used English names in 2000, and thirty-one did so in 2005. In 2010, forty-one singers used English names among the top fifty songs, but usually, three or four singers and groups had more than one or two songs on the chart simultaneously. Korean names (e.g. Baek Ji-young, Seo In-young, and Huh Gak) are seen less frequently, and many K-pop singers have English names (e.g. IU, Sistar, T-ara, GD & TOP, Beast, and After School). Notably, until the early 1990s, musicians with English names would transliterate them into hangul, but now singers would use English names written with the Roman alphabet. In 1995, the percentage of song titles using English in the top 50 charts was 8%. This fluctuated between 30% in 2000, 18% in 2005, and 44% in 2010. An example of a Korean song with a large proportion of English lyrics is Kara's "Jumping," which was released at the same time in both Korea and Japan to much success.

Criticism of hybrid identity
There have been critical responses in South Korea regarding the identity of the genre since its ascendance. Some of the notable music critics in the region have criticized K-pop as "an industrial label mainly designed to promote the national brand in the global market from the beginning" and argued that it was "not formed spontaneously as a pop culture but created with the orchestrated plan led by the government with commercial considerations" although in fact "the genre has practically no ties with traditional Korean identity." There is also the perspective that the name of the genre was derived from J-pop.

K-pop has at times faced criticisms from journalists who perceive the music to be formulaic and unoriginal. Some K-Pop groups have been accused of plagiarizing Western music acts as well as other musical acts. In addition, K-pop has been criticized for its reliance on English phrases, with critics dubbing the use of English in titles "meaningless."

K-pop groups have been regularly accused of cultural appropriation of cultures such as African-American culture, especially due to the frequent use of cornrows and bandanas in idol groups' on-stage styling. K-Pop groups have also been accused of appropriating Native American and Indian cultures. However, debate exists about whether the borrowing of cultural elements from cultures outside of Korea indeed constitutes cultural appropriation, or if this cultural appropriation is negative at all. Scholar Crystal S. Anderson writes that "appropriating elements of a culture by taking them out of their original context and using them in a completely different way does not automatically constitute negative cultural appropriation."

Marketing 

Many agencies have presented new idol groups to an audience through a "debut showcase" which consists of online marketing and television broadcast promotions as opposed to radio. Groups are given a name and a "concept" along with a marketing hook. These concepts are the type of visual and musical theme that idol groups utilize during their debut or comeback. Concepts can change between debuts and fans often distinguish between boy group concepts and girl group concepts. Concepts can also be divided between general concepts and theme concepts, such as cute or fantasy. New idol groups will often debut with a concept well known to the market to secure a successful debut. Sometimes sub-units or sub-groups are formed among existing members. Two example subgroups are Super Junior-K.R.Y., which consists of Super Junior members Kyuhyun, Ryeowook, and Yesung, and Super Junior-M, which became one of the best-selling K-pop subgroups in China.

Online marketing includes music videos posted to YouTube in order to reach a worldwide audience. Prior to the actual video, the group releases teaser photos and trailers. Promotional cycles of subsequent singles are called comebacks  even when the musician or group in question did not go on hiatus.

Dance 

Dance is an integral part of K-pop. When combining multiple singers, the singers often switch their positions while singing and dancing by making prompt movements in synchrony, a strategy called "formation changing". The K-pop choreography often includes the so-called "point dance", referring to a dance made up of hooking and repetitive movements within the choreography that matches the characteristics of the lyrics of the song. Super Junior's "Sorry Sorry" and Brown Eyed Girls' "Abracadabra" are examples of songs with notable "point" choreography. To choreograph a dance for a song requires the writers to take the tempo into account. According to Ellen Kim, a Los Angeles dancer and choreographer, a fan's ability to do the same steps must also be considered. Consequently, K-pop choreographers have to simplify movements.

The training and preparation necessary for K-pop idols to succeed in the industry and dance successfully are intense. Training centers like Seoul's Def Dance Skool develop the dance skills of youth in order to give them a shot at becoming an idol. Physical training is one of the largest focuses at the school, as much of a student's schedule is based around dance and exercise. The entertainment labels are highly selective, so few make it to fame. Students at the school must dedicate their lives to the mastery of dance in order to prepare for the vigorous routines performed by K-pop groups. This, of course, means that the training must continue if they are signed. Companies house much larger training centers for those who are chosen.

An interview with K-pop choreographer Rino Nakasone lends insight into the process of creating routines. According to Nakasone, her focus is to make dance routines that are flattering for the dancers but also complementary to the music. Her ideas are submitted to the entertainment company as video recordings done by professional dancers. Nakasone mentions that the company and the K-pop artists themselves have input on a song's choreography. Choreographer May J. Lee gives another perspective, telling that her choreography often starts out as expressing the feeling or the meaning of the lyrics. What starts out as small movements turns into a full dance that is better able to portray the message of the song.

Fashion 

The emergence of Seo Taiji and Boys in 1992 paved the way for the development of contemporary K-pop groups. The group revolutionized the Korean music scene by incorporating rap and American hip-hop conventions into their music. This adoption of Western style extended to the fashions worn by the boy band: the members adopted a hip-hop aesthetic. Seo and bandmates' outfits for the promotional cycle of "I Know" included vibrant streetwear such as oversized T-shirts and sweatshirts, windbreakers, overalls worn with one strap, overalls worn with one pant leg rolled up, and American sports team jerseys. Accessories included baseball caps worn backwards, bucket hats, and do-rags.

As K-pop "was born of post-Seo trends," many acts that followed Seo Taiji and Boys adopted the same fashion style. Deux and DJ DOC can also be seen wearing on-trend hip-hop fashions such as sagging baggy pants, sportswear, and bandanas in their performances. With Korean popular music transforming into youth-dominated media, manufactured teenage idol groups began debuting in the mid and late 1990s, wearing coordinated costumes that reflected the popular fashion trends among youth at the time. Hip-hop fashion, considered the most popular style in the late '90s, remained, with idol groups H.O.T. and Sechs Kies wearing the style for their debut songs. The use of accessories elevated the idol's style from everyday fashion to performance costume, like ski goggles (worn either around the head or neck), headphones worn around the neck, and oversized gloves worn to accentuate choreography moves were widely used. H.O.T.'s 1996 hit "Candy" exemplifies the level of coordination taken into account for idol's costumes, as each member wore a designated color and accessorized with face paint, fuzzy oversized mittens, visors, bucket hats, and earmuffs, and used stuffed animals, backpacks, and messenger bags as props.

While male idol groups' costumes were constructed with similar color schemes, fabrics, and styles, the outfits worn by each member still maintained individuality. On the other hand, female idol groups of the '90s wore homogeneous costumes, often styled identically. The costumes for female idols during their early promotions often focused on portraying an innocent, youthful image. S.E.S.'s debut in 1997, "('Cause) I'm Your Girl", and Baby Vox's second album 1998 hit, "Ya Ya Ya," featured the girls dressed in white outfits, "To My Boyfriend" by Fin.K.L shows idols in pink schoolgirl costumes, and "One" and "End" of Chakra presented Hindu and African style costumes. To portray a natural and somewhat saccharine image, the accessories were limited to large bows, pompom hair ornaments and hair bands. With the maturation of female idol groups and the removal of bubblegum pop in the late 1990s, the sets of female idol groups focused on following the fashion trends of the time, many of which were revealing pieces. The latest promotions of the girl groups Baby Vox and Jewelry exemplify these trends of hot pants, micro-miniskirts, crop tops, peasant blouses, transparent garments and blouses on the upper part of the torso.

As K-pop became a modern hybrid of Western and Asian cultures starting from the late 2000s, fashion trends within K-pop reflected diversity and distinction as well. Fashion trends from the late 2000s to early 2010s can largely be categorized under the following:
Street: focuses on individuality; features bright colors, mix-and-match styling, graphic prints, and sports brands such as Adidas and Reebok. 
 Retro: aims to bring back "nostalgia" from the 1960s to 1980s; features dot prints and detailed patterns. Common clothing items include denim jackets, boot-cut pants, wide pants, hair bands, scarves, and sunglasses.
 Sexy: highlights femininity and masculinity; features revealing outfits made of satin, lace, fur, and leather. Common clothing items include mini skirts, corsets, net stockings, high heels, sleeveless vests, and see-through shirts.
Black & White: emphasizes modern and chic, symbolizes elegance and charisma, mostly applied to formal wear.
 Futurism: commonly worn with electronic and hip-hop genres; features popping color items, metallic details and prints; promotes a futuristic outlook.

K-pop has a significant influence on fashion in Asia, where trends started by idols are followed by young audiences. Some idols have established status as fashion icons, such as G-Dragon and CL, who has repeatedly worked with fashion designer Jeremy Scott, being labeled his "muse."

According to professor Ingyu Oh, "K-pop emphasizes thin, tall, and feminine looks with adolescent or sometimes very cute facial expressions, regardless of whether they're male or female singers."

Government support 

The South Korean government has acknowledged benefits to the country's export sector as a result of the Korean Wave (it was estimated in 2011 that a US$100 increase in the export of cultural products resulted in a US$412 increase in exports of other consumer goods including food, clothes, cosmetics and IT products) and thus have subsidized certain endeavours. Government initiatives to expand the popularity of K-pop are mostly undertaken by the Ministry of Culture, Sports and Tourism, which is responsible for the worldwide establishment of Korean Cultural Centers. South Korean embassies and consulates have also organized K-pop concerts outside the country, and the Ministry of Foreign Affairs regularly invites overseas K-pop fans to attend the annual K-Pop World Festival in South Korea.

In addition to reaping economic benefits from the popularity of K-pop, the South Korean government has been taking advantage of the influence of K-pop in diplomacy. In an age of mass communication, soft power (pursuing one's goals by persuading stakeholders using cultural and ideological power) is regarded as a more effective and pragmatic diplomatic tactic than the traditional diplomatic strategy hard power (obtaining what one wants from stakeholders through direct intimidation such as military threat and economic sanctions). Cultural diplomacy through K-pop is a form of soft power.

An example of the South Korean government effort in diplomacy through K-pop is the Mnet Asian Music Awards (MAMA), a K-pop music award ceremony. Park Geun-hye (the Korean president at the time) delivered the opening statement at the 2014 MAMA, which was held in Hong Kong and sponsored by the Korean Small and Medium Business Administration (SMBA).  This event was considered a deliberate endeavor by the Korean government to support Korean cultural industries in order to strengthen the nation's international reputation and political influence.

Another example of cultural diplomacy is K-pop performances in North Korea. Prior to 2005, South Korean pop singers occasionally gave performances in North Korea. After an interval of more than a decade, approximately 190 South Korean performers, including well-known musicians Red Velvet, Lee Sun-hee, Cho Yong-pil, and Yoon Do-hyun, performed in Pyongyang, North Korea, on March 31 and April 3, 2018. Kim Jong-un was present in the audience.

History

Origins of Korean popular music

The history of Korean popular music can be traced back to 1885 when an American missionary, Henry Appenzeller, began teaching American and British folk songs at a school. These songs were called changga, and they were typically based on a popular Western melody sung with Korean lyrics. For example, the song "Oh My Darling, Clementine" became known as Simcheongga. During the Japanese rule (1910–1945), the popularity of changga songs rose as Koreans expressed their feelings against Japanese oppression through music. One of the most popular songs was Huimangga. The Japanese confiscated the existing changga collections and published lyrics books of their own.

K-pop was represented by H.O.T in the early days, and it was mostly fanatical, flashy, and showed the rebellious psychology of young people in the emotional aspects. Most of the songs are relatively fast-paced and have a strong sense of rhythm, which is suitable for dancing. They often sing and dance when they perform, and the choreography urbanance is a very important factor in popularity. The first known Korean pop album was I Pungjin Sewol, by Park Chae-seon and Lee Ryu-saek in 1925, which contained popular songs translated from Japanese. The first pop song written by a Korean composer is thought to be Nakhwayusu sung by Lee Jeong-suk in 1929. In the mid-1920s, Japanese composer Masao Koga mixed traditional Korean music with Gospel music that American Evangelists introduced in the 1870s. This type of music became known as Enka in Japan, and later in Korea developed into Trot. In the 1930s singers such as Wang Su-bok, Lee Eun-pa and the Jeogori Sisters popularised folk music further.

1940s–1960s: Arrival of Western culture

After the Korean Peninsula was partitioned into North and South following its liberation in 1945 from Japanese occupation, Western culture was introduced into South Korea on a small scale, with a few Western-styled bars and clubs playing Western music. After the Korean War (1950–1953) U.S. troops remained in South Korea, causing American and world culture to spread in South Korea and Western music to gradually become more accepted. Prominent figures of American entertainment like Nat King Cole, Marilyn Monroe and Louis Armstrong held USO shows in South Korea for the U.S. Army. These visits prompted attention from the Korean public. In 1957, the American Forces Korea Network radio started its broadcast, spreading the popularity of Western music. American music started influencing Korean music, as pentatony was gradually replaced by heptachords and popular songs started to be modeled after American ones.

In the 1960s, the development of LP records and improvements in recording technology led to the pursuit of diverse voice tones. Open auditions were also held to recruit musicians to perform at the U.S. army clubs. Since South Korea was impoverished after the Korean War, skilled Korean singers regarded performing for the U.S. troops as a good means to earn money. Many singers sang for the American troops, usually in dedicated clubs, the number of which rose to 264. They performed various genres like country music, blues, jazz and rock & roll. The South Korean economy started blooming and popular music followed the trend, spread by the first commercial radio stations. Korean cinema also began to develop and Korean musicians began performing to wider audiences.

When Beatlemania reached the shores of Korea the first local rock bands appeared, the first of which is said to be Add4, a band founded in 1962. The first talent contest for rock bands in Seoul was organized in 1968.

Some Korean singers gained international popularity. In 1959, the Kim Sisters went to Las Vegas and became the first Korean artist to release an album in the U.S. pop market. Their cover of "Charlie Brown" reached No.7 on the Billboard Single Chart. The Kim Sisters also appeared on TV programs and radio programs and held tours in the U.S. and Europe. They made 25 appearances on The Ed Sullivan Show—more than American stars like Patti Page and Louis Armstrong (who appeared 18 times each).  The Kim Sisters, Yoon Bok-hee and Patti Kim were the first singers to debut in such countries as Vietnam and the United States. The Kim Sisters became the first Korean group to release an album in the United States. They also performed in Las Vegas. 's 1961 song "The Boy in The Yellow Shirt" was covered by French singer Yvette Giraud and was also popular in Japan.

In the 1960s, the Korean artists such as Shin Joong-hyun,  and Patti Kim who previously performed for the U.S. army clubs reached out to the Korean public. Shin Joong-hyun was so instrumental in the development of Korean rock music that he is regarded as the "godfather of Korean rock" in South Korea.

During this period, with the rise of Western pop music and Korean rock music, trot was no longer predominant in South Korea. However, trot singers like Lee Mi-ja still managed to attract a certain level of popularity, with famous songs like "Camellia Lady".

During the 1950s and 60s, Western pop music, Korean rock music, and trot co-existed in South Korea.

Late 1960s and 1970s: Hippie and folk influences 
At the end of the 1960s Korean pop music underwent another transformation. More and more musicians were university students and graduates who were heavily influenced by American culture and lifestyle (including the hippie movement of the 1960s) and made lighthearted music unlike their predecessors, who were influenced by war and Japanese oppression. The younger generation opposed the Vietnam War as much as American hippies did, which resulted in the Korean government banning songs with more liberal lyrics. In spite of this, folk-influenced pop remained popular among the youth, and local television channel MBC organized a music contest for university students in 1977. This was the foundation of several modern music festivals. The younger generation born after the 1950s had grown up under the U.S. influence and preferred the U.S. lifestyle, giving rise to the "youth culture" which was expressed through long hair, jeans, acoustic guitars and folk music.  The folk music of that time is made up of melodies sung plainly, with the singing accompanied by a guitar or two. A majority of the folk music at that time was initiated by elite university students and those who graduated from prestigious schools. Like the activists of the U.S. student movement, they turned to folk music as the preferred music of politicized youth, who staged demonstrations against the authoritarian government.  In turn, the government banned folk music due to its association with the students' anti-government movements. In the 1970s, the Park Chung-hee government banned American pop music and Korean rock music for their association with sex and drugs. Shin Joong-hyun, the "godfather of Korean rock music," was imprisoned in 1975 due to a marijuana scandal. In order to bolster its anti-Japanese credentials, the government also banned trot songs because of its "Japanese style" given the influence of Japanese enka songs on trot. However, President Park actually embraced trot.

One of the leading figures of the era was Han Dae-soo, who was raised in the United States and influenced by Bob Dylan, Leonard Cohen and John Lennon. Han's song Mul jom juso became iconic among young people in Korea. His daring performances and unique singing style often shocked the public and later he was banned from performing in Korea. Han moved to New York City and pursued his musical career there, only returning to his home country in the 1990s. Other notable singers of the period include Song Chang-sik, Cho Young-nam and Yang Hee-eun.

In the 1970s, DJs also started to become popular.

1980s: The era of ballads

The 1980s saw the rise of ballad singers after 's 1985 album "You’re Too Far Away to Get Close to" sold more than 300,000 copies. Other popular ballad singers included Lee Moon-se (이문세) and Byun Jin-sub (변진섭), nicknamed the "Prince of Ballads". One of the most sought-after ballad composers of the era was Lee Young-hoon (이영훈), whose songs were compiled into a modern musical in 2011 titled Gwanghwamun Yeonga.

The Asia Music Forum was launched in 1980, with representatives from five different Asian countries competing in the event. Korean singer Cho Yong-pil won first place and went on to have a successful career, performing in Hong Kong and Japan. His first album Chang bakkui yeoja was a hit and he became the first Korean singer to take to the stage at Carnegie Hall in New York. Cho's musical repertoire included rock, dance, trot and folk-pop. Despite his early association with rock music as an electric guitarist in a rock band, Cho Yong-pil's initial popularity came from his trot songs which were popular in both South Korea and Japan. For example, in 1976, his trot song, "Please Return to Pusan Port" was a great hit. Despite the temporary setback due to his involvement in a marijuana incident in 1977, he managed to bounce back with the song "The Woman Outside the Window" which reached a record-breaking sales of 1 million in 1980. In 1988, he sang "Seoul Seoul Seoul" in three languages (Korean, English and Japanese) to celebrate the 1988 Seoul Olympic Games.

1990s: Development of modern K-pop

In the 1990s, Korean pop musicians incorporated partially Europop and mostly American popular music styles such as hip hop, rock, jazz, and electronic dance in their music. In 1992 the emergence of Seo Taiji & Boys marked a revolutionary moment in the history of K-pop. The trio debuted on MBC's talent show with their song "I Know" and got the lowest rating from the jury; however, the song and album of the same name became so successful that it paved the way for other songs of the same format. The song's success was attributed to its new jack swing-inspired beats and memorable chorus, as well as innovative lyrics which dealt with the problems of Korean society. Their footsteps were followed by a wave of successful hip hop and R&B artists like Yoo Seung-jun, Jinusean, Solid, Deux, 1TYM and Drunken Tiger.

In 1995, South Korean record producer Lee Soo-man, who was educated in the U.S. and was exposed to the trends in American music, founded the entertainment company SM Entertainment. Former Seo Taiji & Boys' member Yang Hyun-suk formed YG Entertainment in 1996, and Park Jin-young established JYP Entertainment in 1997.

The huge popularity of Seo Taiji & Boys among teenagers shifted the focus of the Korean music industry to teen-centred pop music. Idol bands of young boys or girls were formed to cater to a growing teenage audience. H.O.T. was one of the first idol boybands, debuting in 1996 after rigorous training encompassing not only singing and dancing skills but also etiquette, attitude, language and the ability to deal with the media.  The song "Candy" sung by H.O.T. presented a softer and gentler form of pop music with upbeat and cheerful melodies accompanied by energetic dance steps – a formula adopted by many subsequent idol groups. The group was a huge success and the fans copied the group's hairstyle and fashion. Merchandise affiliated with the group ranging from candy to perfume were sold as well. Their success was followed by that of young boys and girls idol groups like Sechs Kies, S.E.S., Fin.K.L, NRG, Baby Vox, Diva, Shinhwa and g.o.d, which also became popular among the younger generation.

During the late 90s, talent agencies began to market K-pop stars by implementing an idol business model used in J-pop, where talents are selected and trained to appeal to a global audience through formal lessons or through residency programs. They are trained via an extensive and intensive process that includes physical and language training (a program sometimes called abusive), and they are selected for height as well, being much taller on average than their Japanese counterparts. As for looks, "K-pop emphasizes thin, tall, and feminine looks with
adolescent or sometimes very cute facial expressions, regardless of whether they’re male or female singers," according to sociology professor Ingyu Oh. Over time, Korean-American artists have become successful due to their fluency. These efforts increase the marketability of K-pop while also increasing South Korean soft power, which has become an important part of official policy.

The 1990s saw a reactionary movement against mainstream popular culture with the rise of illegal underground music clubs and punk rock bands such as Crying Nut. The 1997 Asian financial crisis prompted South Korean entertainers to look for new markets: H.O.T. released a Mandarin-language album and Diva released an English-language album in Taiwan. The financial crisis also prompted South Korea's leaders to focus on building the nation's cultural influence through music. The government poured millions into building infrastructure, technology, and a specific department within its Ministry of Culture for K-pop. Regulations were passed on karaoke bars, for example, to protect the interests of idols.

21st century: Rise of Hallyu 

K-pop's increasing popularity forms part of Hallyu, or the Korean Wave: the popularity of South Korean culture in other countries. K-pop is increasingly making appearances on Western charts such as Billboard. The development of online social media has been a vital tool for the Korean music industry in reaching a wider audience. As part of the Korean Wave, K-pop has been embraced by the South Korean government as a tool for projecting South Korea's soft power abroad, particularly towards overseas youth. In August 2014, the prominent British news magazine The Economist dubbed Korean pop culture "Asia’s foremost trendsetter."
 
By the beginning of the 21st century,  the K-pop market had slumped and early K-pop idol groups that had seen success in the 90's were on the decline. H.O.T. disbanded in 2001, while other groups like Sechs Kies, S.E.S., Fin.K.L, Shinhwa, and g.o.d became inactive by 2005. Solo singers like BoA and Rain grew in success. However, the success of the boy band TVXQ after its debut in 2003 marked the resurgence of idol groups to Korean entertainment and the growth of K-pop as part of Hallyu. The birth of second-generation K-pop was followed with the successful debuts of SS501 (2005), Super Junior (2005), Big Bang (2006), Wonder Girls (2007), Girls' Generation (2007), Kara (2007), Shinee (2008), 2NE1 (2009), 4Minute (2009), T-ara (2009), f(x) (2009), and After School (2009).

During the beginning of the 21st century, K-pop idols began receiving success elsewhere in Asia: in 2002, Baby Vox's single "Coincidence" became popular in many Asian countries after it was released and promoted during the World Cup in South Korea. BoA became the first K-pop singer to reach No. 1 on the Japanese Oricon music chart and shortly afterwards, Rain had a sold-out concert to an audience of 40,000 fans in Beijing. In 2003, Baby Vox topped the Chinese music charts with their Chinese single "I'm Still Loving You" from their third album Devotion, the first idol group to do so, creating a huge fanbase in China. They also charted in various music charts in Thailand. TVXQ marked the rise of K-pop boy bands in Japan. In 2008, their single "Purple Line" made TVXQ the first foreign boy band and second Korean artist after BoA to top the Oricon music chart.

Since the mid-2000s, a huge portion of the East Asian music market has been dominated by K-pop. In 2008, South Korea's cultural exports (including television dramas and computer games) rose to US$2 billion, maintaining an annual growth rate of over 10%. That year, Japan accounted for almost 68% of all K-pop export revenues, ahead of China (11.2%) and the United States (2.1%). The sale of concert tickets proved to be a lucrative business; TVXQ's Tohoshinki Live Tour in Japan sold over 850,000 tickets at an average cost of US$109 each, generating a total of US$92.6 million in revenues.

Elsewhere in the world, the genre has rapidly grown in success, especially after Psy's "Gangnam Style" music video was the first YouTube video to reach one billion views, achieving widespread coverage in mainstream media. As of December 2020, the video has 3.9 billion views. Several failed attempts have been made by entertainment companies to break into the English-language market, including BoA, Wonder Girls, Girls' Generation, and CL. BTS won Top Social Artist at the 2017 Billboard Music Awards in 2017, making them the first K-pop group to win a BBMA. Their performance of the song "DNA" at the American Music Awards, the first AMA performance by a K-pop group, also led to the song peaking at number 67 on the Billboard Hot 100. The following year, BTS became the first K-pop group to reach number 1 on the Billboard 200 with Love Yourself: Tear. The K-Pop industry is active in New York City, hosting numerous concerts in the city as well as being home to K-Pop musicians. The musical KPOP opened Off-Broadway in 2017 and moved to Broadway in 2022.

Industry

Agencies
K-pop has spawned an entire industry encompassing music production houses, event management companies, music distributors, and other merchandise and service providers. The three biggest companies in terms of sales and revenue are SM Entertainment, YG Entertainment and JYP Entertainment, often referred to as the 'Big Three.' These record labels also function as representative agencies for their artists. They are responsible for recruiting, financing, training, and marketing new artists as well as managing their musical activities and public relations. Currently, the agency with the greatest market share is S.M. Entertainment. In 2011, together with Star J Entertainment, AM Entertainment, and Key East, the Big Three companies founded the joint management company United Asia Management.

Sales and market value
In 2009, DFSB Kollective became the first distributor of K-pop on iTunes.

In 2011, 1,100 albums were released in South Korea. The hip-hop genre had the most representation, at two-thirds of the total albums. One-third of the albums were from a variety of other genres, including rock, modern folk, and crossover.

In 2012, the average cost of obtaining a K-pop song in South Korea amounted to US$0.10 for a single download, or $0.002 when streamed online. In the first half of 2012, according to Billboard, the Korean music industry grossed nearly US$3.4 billion—a 27.8% increase on the previous year—and was recognized by Time magazine as "South Korea's Greatest Export."

Please refer to table below for a look at a 2.1 billion increase in sales for the Korean music industry, from 2014 to 2018.

Record charts

Korean record charts include the Gaon Digital Chart and the Billboard K-pop Hot 100. Some K-pop records have appeared on the Oricon Albums Chart of Japan and the Billboard Hot 100 of the United States.

In 2009, singer Hwangbo entered the European music industry for a short period when she released the single R2song, reaching # 1 on the world's largest dance music site JunoDowload, being successful in the United Kingdom, Europe, as well as Korea; becoming the first Asian artist to achieve it.

In May 2014, Exo became the third K-pop act to enter the Billboard 200 that year after 2NE1, Girls' Generation and Wonder Girls were the first K-Pop act to chart on Billboard 200.

In October 2016, BTS's album Wings becomes the first Korean album to chart in the UK Album Charts, reaching #62, and the highest-charting and best selling K-pop album in the Billboard 200. In February 2017, BTS landed their fourth album You Never Walk Alone at #61 on the Billboard 200. In September 2017, BTS landed at #14 on the UK Album Charts with their new album, Love Yourself: Her. Love Yourself: Tear debuted at number one on the US Billboard 200 with 135,000 album-equivalent units (including 100,000 pure album sales), becoming BTS' highest-charting and first number one album in the US, the first K-pop album to top the US albums chart, and the highest-charting album by an Asian act. "Fake Love" peaked at number ten on the Billboard Hot 100 that same week, becoming the band's highest reaching song on the chart as well as their first in the top ten. Overall, only twenty non-English songs have reached the top ten, with "Fake Love" being the first for a K-Pop group. The single also debuted at number seven on Billboard's Streaming Songs chart with 27.4 million streams earned in the week ending May 24, giving BTS its first top ten on the chart and making "Fake Love" the first K-pop song to land on top ten since Psy's "Hangover" feat. Snoop Dogg in 2014. In August 2020, their song "Dynamite" topped the Billboard Hot 100 in its opening week, becoming the group's first number-one single in the US and their fourth top-10 entry. BTS became the first K-pop act in Hot 100 history to debut at number one.

In June 2018, YG Entertainment's girl group Blackpink became the first K-pop girl group to hit within the top 50 of Billboard 200 album chart; their first mini-album SQUARE UP debuted at No. 40. Their title song "Ddu Du Ddu Du" charted at No. 55 on the Billboard Hot 100 chart, making it the highest-charting song and the first full Korean-language song by a K-pop girl group. Since then, they have beaten their own record with Ice Cream peaking at #13 on the Billboard Hot 100.

Trainee system

By convention in modern K-pop, trainees go through a rigorous training system for an undetermined amount of time before debut. This method was popularized by Lee Soo-man, founder of S.M. Entertainment, as part of a concept labelled "cultural technology." The Verge described this as an "extreme" system of artist management. According to the CEO of Universal Music's Southeast Asian branch, the Korean idol trainee system is unique in the world.

Because of the training period, which can last for many years, and the significant amount of investment that agencies put towards their trainees, the industry is very serious about launching new artists. Trainees may enter an agency through auditions or be scouted, and once recruited are given accommodation and classes (commonly singing, dancing, rapping, and foreign languages such as Mandarin, English and Japanese) while they prepare for debut. Young trainees sometimes attend school at the same time. There is no age limit to become a trainee and no limit to the duration one can spend as a trainee.

Television 

The Korean music industry has spawned numerous related reality TV shows, including talent shows such as Superstar K and K-pop Star, specialist rap competition Show Me the Money and its female counterpart Unpretty Rapstar, and many 'survival' shows, which commonly pit trainees against each other in order to form a new idol group. Examples of survival shows include Jellyfish Entertainment's MyDOL, which formed boy group VIXX; YG Entertainment's WIN: Who Is Next, which formed boy group Winner, and its follow-up MIX&MATCH, which formed iKon; JYP Entertainment's Sixteen, which formed girl group Twice; Starship Entertainment's No.Mercy, which formed boy group Monsta X; Cube Entertainment's Pentagon Maker, which formed boy group Pentagon; Mnet's Produce 101, which formed girl groups I.O.I and Iz*One and boy groups Wanna One and X1; Duble Kick Entertainment's Finding Momo Land, which formed girl group Momoland; Mnet's Idol School, which formed girl group Fromis 9; Belift Lab's I-Land, which formed boy group Enhypen; MBC's My Teenage Girl, which formed girl group Classy; and Mnet’s Girls Planet 999, which formed girl group Kep1er. The rise in these shows, which often involves larger agencies contracting smaller agencies' trainees into project groups and taking a larger portion of the revenues, has led to criticisms over the former monopolizing the industry.

Criticism of industry practices

Corruption 
In 2002, Time magazine reported that Korean television producers such as Hwang Yong-woo and Kim Jong-jin had been arrested for "accepting under-the-table payments guaranteeing TV appearances to aspiring singers and musicians" in a bid to tackle "systemic corruption in South Korea's music business." Companies investigated included SidusHQ and S.M. Entertainment.

Poor living and working conditions 
K-pop management companies have also been criticized for exploitation of idols through overwork and restrictive contracts, described as "slave contracts" in a BBC report. According to The Hollywood Reporter, "Korea's entertainment business is notoriously improvisational and unregulated. In-demand K-pop stars – many of whom are teenage 'idols' – have been known to rehearse and perform without sleep."

In July 2009, S.M. Entertainment was taken to court by TVXQ and a Super Junior member, who alleged that their working conditions had led to adverse health effects. The court decision in the TVXQ lawsuit determined their contract with S.M. Entertainment void, and resultantly the Fair Trade Commission released contract templates to regulate industry conditions.

In 2014, South Korea passed a law to regulate its music industry, protecting idols aged under 19 from unhealthy labor practices and overtly sexualized performances and guaranteeing them "the basic rights to learn, rest and sleep." Failure to comply with these regulations may lead to the equivalent of a US$10,000 fine.

Industry professionals such as SM Entertainment's CEO Kim Young-min have defended the system, arguing that individuals trained within the system are "no different than typical middle or high school kids, who go to after-school programs to cram for college entrance exams." Kim has also argued that there is a need to consider the expenses incurred by the company during the trainee period, including "facilities, equipment, costumes, and virtually everything the trainees need."

On March 7, 2017, the South Korea Fair Trade Commission (KFTC) passed new regulations in order to protect trainee idols from unfair terms and working conditions. Prior to these regulations, trainee idols at eight idol agencies were not permitted to seek contracts at any other agency while at training. Moreover, agencies were able to terminate a trainee contract at any time for any reason. The Fair Trade Commission states that they believe these changes will "result in a more just contract culture within the entertainment industry between trainee and agency." The Ministry of Culture applied these regulations to all existing agencies throughout 2018.

Some of the concerns raised by the idol agencies over these regulations include the risk of a trainee at one agency going undercover at another agency to receive training with the other agency. This introduces the further risk that the idol agencies must take in training new idols. Trainees train for 3 years on average and the agencies support these trainees with various training programs during this duration, resulting in each trainee being a very large investment for the agency.

Tight control over public image 
K-pop management is very strict in terms of regulating the public appearance of their groups, according to Michael Hurt, a lecturer of cultural theory at the Korea National University of Arts. Therefore, he reasoned, most stars are not allowed to date publicly or have "control of their own lives". Kwon Joon-won, an entertainment management professor at the Dong-ah Institute of Media and Arts, said K-pop stars should be expected to lose half of their fandom if they were to make controversial statements. This may explain why K-pop groups are more outspoken about social issues abroad than within South Korea.

Sexualization and pressure on appearance 
The industry has been criticized for the sexualization of both male and female idols, with the sexualization of minors in particular being of concern. Critics such as James Turnbull of the Korean Pop Culture blog The Grand Narrative have argued young female idols are especially susceptible to pressures to wear revealing clothing or dance provocatively.  However, compared to western popular music, K-pop has little sex, drugs, or aggressive behavior and has a much more parent-friendly branding. In 2014, South Korea passed a law to protect idols under the age of 19 from overtly sexualized performances.

Questions have also been raised over K-pop's focus on appearance and its effects on children and teens, especially the pressure to obtain cosmetic surgeries. In 2019, the South Korean Ministry of Gender Equality and Family announced non-mandatory guidelines in an effort to prevent "lookism." One recommendation asked to limit how many idol singers can appear on TV together, concerned that their nearly identical appearances would narrow the beauty standards, "most of them are skinny ... with outfits exposing their bodies." Many young viewers are raised in a culture where cosmetic surgery is promoted, which some K-pop idols document openly. In response, however, many fans protested the government recommendations in an online petition. An opposition politician compared them to regulations under the "military dictatorship of Chun Doo-hwan".

Mental health 
Some K-pop artists have suggested that the uncertainty and pressures of their jobs as entertainers may be detrimental to their mental health. According to musician Park Kyung of Block B, "There are many people who debuted with no sense of self yet, and they come to realize later that every move and every word they say is being observed so they become cautious and lose their freedom." In an interview with Yonhap, Suga of BTS talked about his own mental health, and said, "Anxiety and loneliness seem to be with me for life…Emotions are so different in every situation and every moment, so I think to agonise every moment is what life is." The suicides of prominent K-pop musicians have drawn attention to industry pressures. Kim Jonghyun, who had previously been open about his history of depression, also died by suicide in December 2017. In the spring of 2018, a number of prominent Korean musicians participated in a free concert series to raise awareness of suicide prevention. In 2019, the death of Sulli of an apparent suicide, followed by the death of Goo Hara, both who were subjected to cyberbullying, added to calls for reform.

Culture
K-pop artists are frequently referred to as idols or idol groups. Groups usually have a leader, who is often the eldest or most experienced member and speaks for the group. The youngest group member is called the maknae. The popular use of this term in Japan was influenced by boy group SS501 when they expanded their activities in the country in 2007. Its Japanese translation man'ne was often used to name the group's youngest member Kim Hyung-jun in order to differentiate him from their leader with a similar name and spelling, Kim Hyun-joong.

Industry-specific expressions

Appeal and fan base

Many fans travel overseas to see their idols on tour, and tourists commonly visit Korea from Japan and China to see K-pop concerts. A K-pop tour group from Japan had more than 7,000 fans fly to Seoul to meet boy band JYJ in 2012, and during JYJ's concert in Barcelona in 2011, fans from many parts of the world camped overnight to gain entrance. A 2011 survey conducted by the Korean Culture and Information Service reported that there were over 3 million active members of Hallyu fan clubs.

Bang Si-hyuk, the music industry executive behind BTS, expressed that K-pop idol fans view their idol differently from how music fans view a typical singer. Idol fans want to feel close to and be a part of their idol's lifestyle, even outside of live performances.

An article by The Wall Street Journal indicated that K-pop's future staying power will be shaped by fans, whose online activities have evolved into "micro-businesses." K-pop groups commonly have dedicated fan clubs with a collective name and sometimes an assigned colour, to which they will release merchandise. For example, TVXQ fans are known as 'Cassiopeia,' and their official colour is 'pearl red.' Some of the more popular groups have personalized light sticks for use at concerts; for example, Big Bang fans hold yellow crown-shaped light sticks. 

Fan clubs sometimes participate in charity events to support their idols, purchasing bags of 'fan rice' in order to show support. The rice bags are donated to those in need. According to Time, for one of BigBang's shows, 12.7 tons of rice were donated from 50 fan clubs around the world. There are businesses in Korea dedicated to shipping rice from farmers to the venues. Another way that fan clubs show their devotion is by sending lunch to idols during their schedules, and there are catering companies in South Korea specifically for this purpose.

A unique feature of K-pop fandom is the "fan chant". When an idol group releases a new song, chants, usually consisting of group members' names, are performed by live concert audiences during non-singing parts of songs.

Obsession

Some idols and idol groups have faced problems from obsessive fans who indulge in stalking or invasive behavior. These fans are known as sasaeng fans, from the Korean word for 'private life,' which alludes to their penchant for invading the privacy of idols and members of idol groups. There have been accounts of extreme behaviors from fans trying to gain idols' attention. Korean public officials recognize this as a unique but serious concern.

Some idols have reacted angrily towards sasaeng fans, for which they received backlash; including members of JYJ, Super Junior member Kim Hee-chul, and Jang Keun-suk.

In response to the issue, a new law introduced in February 2016 in Korea saw the penalty for stalking rise to around US$17,000 as well as a possible two-year jail sentence.

Events

International tours

Conventions and music festivals

 2003–present: Korean Music Festival at the Hollywood Bowl in Los Angeles
 2009–present: Philippine K-pop Convention
 2011–present: K-POP World Festival in South Korea
 2012–present: KCON in California
 2015–present: KCON in New York
 2015–present: KCON in Japan

Social media
Social media sites such as YouTube, Twitter, and Facebook allow K-pop artists to reach a global audience and to communicate readily with their fans. As global online music market revenue increased 19% from 2009 to 2014 with social media, music consumers around the world are more likely to be exposed to K-pop. K-pop idol groups benefit from video-based social media such as YouTube since visual components such as dance and fashion are essential factors in their performance. The number of searches of "K-pop" on YouTube increased by a factor of 33 from 2004 to 2014. Through social media advertisement, Korean entertainment companies narrowed the cultural gap so K-pop could enter the global market and gain recognition among overseas consumers. The export of K-pop dramatically increased from US$13.9 million to US$204 million between 2007 and 2011. Social media also changes the consumption patterns of K-pop music. Before the digital era, people would purchase and consume music products on an individual basis. Consumers now actively participate in sharing music products and advertising their favorite artists, which is advantageous for K-pop.

K-pop fandoms are highly active on the said platforms as well as the likes of Instagram, TikTok, Reddit, Tumblr and Twitch.

YouTube 

Since K-pop started to spread its industry outside South Korea, K-pop artists have set notable records on YouTube. Of the 2.28 billion worldwide K-pop YouTube views in 2011, 240 million came from the United States, more than double the figure from 2010 (94 million). In December 2011, K-pop became the first country-specific genre of music to gain a homepage on YouTube. In December 2012, Psy's music video for "Gangnam Style" became the first YouTube video to receive 1 billion views. In 2016 the music video for the song "TT" by Twice became the first video by a female Korean act with over 400 million YouTube views. On January 21, 2019, girl group Blackpink's music video for "Ddu-Du-Ddu-Du" became the highest viewed K-pop group music video on YouTube. On April 12, 2019, BTS' music video for "Boy with Luv" set a record for the most viewed online music video in the first 24 hours, garnering over 74 million views.

Twitter 
Twitter has also been a significant social media platform for K-pop stars to get connections and promotions. The viral song "Gangnam Style" gained popularity from mentions by prominent Twitter users. Bang Si Hyuk, the producer of BTS, partially attributed the fast growth of their fanbase to social media such as Twitter. On November 13, 2017, BTS became the first South Korean act to reach 10 million followers on Twitter. In 2017, BTS was the most tweeted-about artist both in the United States and globally. Other K-pop groups, such as Seventeen and Monsta X, also appeared in the global top ten. Exo, a South Korean boyband, was the most followed celebrity to have entered Twitter in 2017. At the 2017, 2018, and 2019 Billboard Music Awards, BTS won the award for Top Social Media Artist based on Twitter voting by their fans. According to Sin Chang Seob, the CEO of Twitter Korea, the usage of Twitter by K-pop artists has increased Twitter's popularity among South Koreans.

Facebook 
Many Korean entertainment companies use social media platforms, especially Facebook, to promote and communicate about their global auditions. K-pop groups use Facebook pages to promote their music and other content to large numbers of fans. K-pop fans use Facebook to express their devotion, communicate with other members of the K-pop community, and consume K-pop content.

TikTok 
Multiple entertainment companies use TikTok to market and promote their artists' music. Many K-pop songs have gone viral on TikTok and some K-pop artists and their labels were contacted for possible collaborations. The "Any Song" dance challenge by rapper Zico got 400 million views in less than two months, and around 830,000 videos have been uploaded featuring the sound.

Popularity and impact

East Asia

Japan 
Following the lifting of WWII-era restrictions imposed on exchanges and trade between Korea and Japan in the late 1990s, the first-generation girl group S.E.S became the first Korean artists to debut in Japan in late 1998 and their first Japanese-language album Reach Out in 1999. Young K-pop star BoA had Japanese language training before her Korean debut and when she debuted in Japan in 2002, her Korean identity was inessential. Her music style and fluent Japanese led her to be considered a part of J-pop. BoA's debut Japanese album released in 2002, entitled Listen to My Heart, was the first album by a Korean singer to debut at the top of the Japanese Oricon Charts and become an RIAJ-certified "million-seller" in Japan. Since her Japanese debut, BoA has released several albums, all of which have topped the Oricon Charts.

Following BoA's successful Japanese debut, TVXQ debuted in Japan in 2005 under a procedure similar to BoA's. TVXQ did not promote that they were Korean and their ballad-style songs fit well into J-pop's typical sound. TVXQ's first and second albums released in Japan were minor successes, peaking on the Oricon Charts at twenty-five and ten respectively. However, on January 16, 2008, TVXQ reached the top of the Oricon Charts with their sixteenth Japanese single "Purple Line." This made them the first Korean male group to have a number-one single in Japan. They have since had remarkable success with their comebacks. In 2018, they accumulated over 1.2 million people to their concerts, beating Japanese band B'z. Since the start of the Korean Wave, the Japanese market has seen an influx of Korean pop acts such as SS501, Shinee, Super Junior, Big Bang, Kara and Girls' Generation. In 2011, it was reported that the total sales for K-pop artists' increased 22.3% between 2010 and 2011 in Japan. Some Korean artists were in the top 10 selling artists of the year in Japan.

As of 2019, several other K-pop groups have made their debut in the Japanese market including Exo, BTS, Got7, Seventeen, iKon, GFriend, Astro, Pentagon, Twice, Monsta X, FT Island, NCT 127 and Blackpink. Many of these groups debut with Japanese versions of their recent Korean releases, then later release original Japanese songs. Many groups such as NCT 127, Twice, and Pentagon also include Japanese members that auditioned in Japan and were brought to Korea, or came to Korea in order to become a K-pop singer.

With tensions still remaining between Korea and Japan, the import of Korean popular culture has been met with different forms of resistance, in the form of the 'Anti-Korean Wave.' One demonstration against the Korean Wave with roughly 500 participants was broadcast on Japan's Fuji TV to an Internet audience of over 120,000. However, the chairman of the Presidential Council on National Branding cited this resistance as proof of "how successful Korean Wave is." The Korean Wave has also interested Japanese people to pursue a pop music career by going to Korea to become K-pop stars.

China

The 1990s saw the rise of K-pop in China through groups like H.O.T. and Sechs Kies—sparking China's investment in Korea's entertainment industry. K-pop artists have achieved considerable success in China since then: in 2005, Rain held a concert in Beijing with 40,000 attendees. In 2010, the Wonder Girls won an award for the highest digital sales for a foreign artist, with 5 million digital downloads, in the 5th annual China Mobile Wireless Music Awards. Most recently, China has become the South Korean entertainment industry's biggest market for exports. Twelve percent of SM Entertainment's sales in 2015 went to China, and this number rose to 14.4 percent by the middle of 2016. China has found that K-pop is a profitable investment. According to Director of Communication for the Korea Economic Institute of America Jenna Gibson, sales for a certain shampoo brand rose by 630% after Super Junior endorsed it on a Chinese reality show. K-pop's popularity has also led China's e-commerce company Alibaba to buy roughly $30 million worth of SM Entertainment's shares in 2016 in order to help its expansion into the online music industry. Legend Capital China has also invested in BTS' label BigHit Entertainment. As of the beginning of 2017, China took up around 8-20 percent of major Korean entertainment companies' total sales. Chinese entertainment companies have also claimed stakes in the industry, partially overseeing groups like EXID and T-ara or representing groups which include both Chinese and Korean members like Uniq and WJSN.

Having Chinese members in K-pop groups is one way that Korean entertainment companies increase K-pop's marketability and appeal in China. Other strategies include giving Korean members Chinese-sounding names, releasing songs or whole albums in Chinese, and making subgroups with members that predominantly speak Mandarin—like SM Entertainment's Exo-M and Super Junior-M, which has had successful results on the Kuang Nan Record and CCR.

The K-pop industry's methods of producing idols have influenced the practices of Chinese entertainment companies, which aim to reproduce K-pop idols' success with their own stars so that Chinese entertainers can compete better globally. To achieve this, those companies have recruited K-pop industry experts, and some of these insiders have actively started moving into the Chinese music industry to capitalize on K-pop's increasing influence on market demands. Chinese reality show Idol Producer further highlights K-pop's impact on China's entertainment scene: closely mirroring Korea's Produce 101.

A number of Chinese K-pop idols, such as Super Junior-M's Han Geng and Exo-M's Kris, Luhan, and Tao, have left their respective K-pop groups in order to pursue solo careers in China. However, lately, Korean entertainment companies have allowed their Chinese K-pop idols more freedom in pursuing solo work in China. Got7's Jackson Wang, for example, has released several of his own songs in China and, in 2017, reached number one on Chinese music charts.

Additionally, the rise of K-pop has led to an increase in the number of Chinese tourists in South Korea—3.8 million more Chinese toured South Korea in 2016 than 2015 according to the Union of International Associations. K-pop has also made China's youth find South Korean culture "cool", thus helping to facilitate greater understanding between Korea and China.

North Korea 
Despite North Korea's traditionally strict isolationism, K-pop has managed to reach a North Korean audience. While consumption of South Korean entertainment is punishable by death in North Korea, it has still become increasingly more available with the global rise of technology and the implementation of underground smuggling networks over the past decades. The popular flash drive technology containing K-pop and K-dramas was preceded by the use of DVDs burned with such content. Because North Korean law enforcement had figured out how to catch people consuming the media from DVDs, few people accessed K-pop and K-dramas. Many North Koreans considered the risk too great, so it was not until the proliferation of the flash drive media type that watching the K-pop shows hit common homes. Utilizing the increasingly sophisticated smuggling networks, several thousands of USB drives and SD cards containing K-pop and K-dramas have been distributed and sold through care packages and the black market. Some South Korean humanitarians have also deployed drones and balloons carrying these flash drives in order to make the media more accessible. In fact, access to USB drives and SD cards exponentially rose from 26% to 81% in from 2010 to 2014 largely due to development in technology, with a large majority containing South Korean music and dramas. The expanding technology capabilities allowed the flash drives to be accessed by a wider North Korean audience. Flash drives that used to cost upwards of US$50, can now be purchased for under $10, making them more affordable and easier to send into North Korea. The content on these USB drives and SD cards are then viewed by plugging the device into a Notel, a small portable media player. Although this practice had originally begun with banned books and simple radios, there is now an even higher demand for South Korean media following the cultural phenomena of hallyu.

Those near the border who choose to stay away from the banned media from flash drives often cannot escape it. Ever since the 1950s, both countries have blasted their own propaganda across the DMZ: North Korea broadcasting anti-south propaganda and South Korea broadcasting Korean and world news as well as K-pop. In 2004, both countries agreed to end the broadcasts. After an incident in 2015, South Korea resumed broadcasting anti-North news for four days, as well as in 2016, after North Korea tested its hydrogen bomb and has been broadcasting since. In April 2018, in preparation and out of respect for the meeting between North leader Kim Jong Un and South leader, Moon Jae In, the South Korean speakers ceased their broadcasts. These 11 loudspeakers can be heard up to  into North Korean territory. This enables the broadcasts to influence possible defectors staying near the border as well as create bothersome propaganda that North Korean soldiers cannot escape.

The dissemination of K-pop and Korean media has been crucial in presenting the realities of North Korea to its citizens. By detailing the basic conditions of life in South Korea and introducing foreign ideologies, Korean media has aroused civil unrest amongst both citizens and elites concerning the disparities between living conditions inside and outside North Korea. A defector explains that, when he escaped in 2012, only the wealthy families were the ones consuming the South Korean media because the costs of the flash drives and technology to use them were so high. Because most youths lacked the resources to afford the drives, most consumers of South Korean media before 2012 were the middle-aged elite who favored K-dramas over K-pop due to their more traditional behavior. The current high demand for Korean media continues to rise as now approximately 70% of North Koreans consume foreign media in their homes, which accounts for the higher youth following of South Korean media today. One researcher at the Korea Institute for National Unification claims to have never met a single defector who had not seen or listened to foreign media before entering South Korea. Yet experts remain wary that a cultural uprising will occur because of the media. Consuming South Korean media serves many purposes for North Koreans such as enjoyment and education, but few consider uprooting a totalitarian regime because of the cultures they've experienced through K-pop and K-dramas.

Even North Korean leader Kim Jong-un has shown a liking for K-pop music. In 2018, Kim stated he was "deeply moved" after attending a two-hour concert in Pyongyang featuring South Korean performers such as singer Cho Yong-pil and the popular girl band Red Velvet. This historic concert marks the first performance by South Korean artists attended by a North Korean leader in Pyongyang. The concert featuring over 150 South Korean artists, attended by 1500 North Korean elites, also displays growing relations between the North and the South. None of the song line ups, lyrics, or dance moves of the performers were asked to be changed by traditionalist North Korean officials. This acceptance of the K-pop genre and its content shows a stark contrast to Kim Jong Un's historically stringent policies on foreign media. The South Korean artists also performed alongside notable North Korean artists in the following week. Recordings of both performances have been made public to South Koreans, though no reports have been made of their release to the North Korean public. Despite all the previous events Kim Jong-un has changed his stance on K-pop since 2021 by referring to it as a "vicious cancer" and viewing it as a threat to North Korean society.

Taiwan 
Despite sharing a similar past, the Taiwanese did not carry a positive sentiment towards South Korea after 1992, which is when South Korea broke off its diplomatic relationship with Taiwan in order to pursue one with mainland China. This changed in the early 2000s as the cultural dispersion of Hallyu has contributed to the reconstruction of South Korea's image among the Taiwanese. This change was partly prompted by the South Korean government, which wished to encourage goodwill between the two countries after the break of diplomacy. Many Taiwanese have since remarked that Korean popular music and Korean dramas have helped to foster a renewed interest and healthier relationship with South Korea.

Southeast Asia

Singapore 
There is a thriving K-pop fanbase in Singapore, where idol groups, such as 2NE1, BTS, Girls' Generation, Got7 and Exo, often hold concert tour dates. The popularity of K-pop alongside Korean dramas has influenced the aesthetics image of Singaporeans. Korean-style "straight eyebrows" have become quite popular among many Singaporean females and males of Chinese, Malay and Indian descent. Singaporean beauty salons have seen an increase in the number of customers interested in getting Korean-style "straight eyebrows" and Korean-style haircuts in recent years. On August 5, 2017, Singapore hosted the 10th Music Bank World Tour, a concert spin-off of Music Bank, a popular weekly music programme by South Korean broadcaster KBS. This event proved the immense popularity of the Hallyu wave in Singapore.

Malaysia
In Malaysia, among the three main ethnic groups—Malay, Chinese and Indian—many prefer to listen to music in their own languages, but K-pop and Korean movies and TV series have become popular among all three ethnic groups, which Malaysian firms have capitalized upon. The popularity of K-pop has also resulted in politicians bringing K-pop idols to the country in order to attract young voters. Malaysians have accepted the Korean Wave more rapidly and even more favorably, notably in the 2010s, despite the fact that it came to Malaysia later and that the first reaction there was relatively hostile compared to other nations. Approximately 80% of Malaysian respondents have begun learning the Korean language due to their keen interest in Korean culture. Malaysia is also seventh in the world for the quantity of travelers visiting Korea.

Indonesia
K-pop along with Korean TV series and movies has turned into popular culture, especially among the young generation of Indonesia. This trend can be observed in any major city in the country. K-pop has also influenced music in Indonesia. Popularity of Korean culture has increased continuously in Indonesia since the early 2000s, starting with the East Asian popular culture boom.

Philippines

Korean telenovelas were aired locally in the Philippines starting in 2003, marking a further expansion of the Hallyu wave. K-pop took longer to catch on; it gained popularity through the internet, and through Korean expatriate celebrities like Sandara Park. Super Junior held a concert in the Philippines in 2010.

Vietnam 
Vietnam already had numerous contacts with South Korea in the past and even shared a similar political situation, notably the separation in half of both nations. Despite the tragedies of the Vietnam War, the country presently remains welcoming of the Korean influence on the Vietnamese population. Vietnamese pop music, known as V-pop, is heavily influenced by K-pop in terms of music production and music videos.

In 2015, the northern capital city of Hanoi hosted the Music Bank World Tour. In the year of 2018, V Live and RBW Entertainment Vietnam launched special monthly mini-concerts called "V Heartbeat Live," inviting both V-pop and K-pop stars to perform, such as Winner, Momoland, IKon, Sunmi, and more. In the same year, Park Ji-yeon collaborated with a Vietnamese singer, Soobin Hoàng Sơn, releasing Vietnamese and Korean versions of the single "Between Us." K-pop, and Korean culture in general, gained popularity mainly because of the Vietnamese youth.

South Korean entertainment companies are investing and searching for talent in Vietnam. For example, SM Entertainment announced plans for a Vietnamese sub-unit of the Korean boy group NCT, which executive producer Lee Soo-man called "NCT-V," to promote V-pop globally. Lee also said that Vietnamese culture is extremely similar to Korean culture, which is favorable for both countries in terms of global expansion. In 2018, SM Entertainment hosted their annual Global Audition in Hanoi and Ho Chi Minh City for the first time ever. Cube Entertainment held an audition session in 2018. On January 11–13 in 2019, Big Hit Entertainment established a joint venture with entertainment company CJ E&M to host an audition called the "2019 Belift Global Audition." SBS also announced that popular variety show "Running Man" will be getting a Vietnamese version. These are prime examples of hallyu and the rising popularity of K-pop in Vietnam.

South Asia

Bangladesh 
Bangladeshi youths, especially teens, have shown great attraction to Korean pop music as they described such songs make them feel better. Starting from 2015, Bangladesh began to participate in an annual event called K-Pop World Music Festival which started in 2011 by the Ministry of Foreign Affairs of the Republic of Korea in cooperation with The Korean Broadcasting System (KBS). The objective of the event is not only to bring the Hallyu fans all over the world to South Korea but also to bring people from different countries together in the name of culture.

India 
In the Northeast Indian state of Manipur, where separatists have banned Bollywood movies, consumers have turned to Korean popular culture for their entertainment needs. The BBC's correspondent Sanjoy Majumder reported that Korean entertainment products are mostly unlicensed copies smuggled in from neighbouring Burma, and are generally well received by the local population. This has led to the increasing use of Korean phrases in common parlance amongst the young people of Manipur.

In order to capitalize on the popularity of K-pop in Manipur, many hairdressing salons have offered "Korean-style" cuts based on the hairstyles of K-pop boy bands. This wave of Korean popular culture is currently spreading from Manipur to the neighbouring state of Nagaland. K-pop is catching up in various other states of the country and K-pop festivals and competitions draw thousands of fans.

Nepal
In Nepal, K-pop gained popularity along with Korean dramas and films. K-pop has become influential in the Nepali music industry and K-pop music videos are often used as an accompaniment to Nepali music on YouTube.

North America

In 2006, Rain held sold-out concerts in New York and Las Vegas as part of his Rain's Coming World Tour.

In 2009, the Wonder Girls became the first K-pop artist to debut on the Billboard Hot 100 singles chart. They went on to join the Jonas Brothers on the Jonas Brothers World Tour 2009. In 2010, they toured 20 cities in the United States, Canada and Mexico, and were named House of Blues "Artist of the Month" for June.

In 2010, SM Entertainment held the SMTown Live '10 World Tour with dates in Los Angeles, Paris, Tokyo, and New York. The same year, during the 8th Annual Korean Music Festival, K-pop artists made their first appearances at the Hollywood Bowl.

Notable K-pop concerts in the United States in 2011 include the KBS Concert at the New York Korea Festival, the K-Pop Masters Concert in Las Vegas, and the Korean Music Wave in Google, which was held at Google's headquarters in Mountain View, California.

2012 marked a breakthrough year for K-pop in North America. At the start of the year, Girls' Generation performed the English version of "The Boys" on the late-night talk show The Late Show with David Letterman and also on the daytime talk show Live! with Kelly, becoming the first Korean musical act to perform on these shows, and the first Korean act to perform on syndicated television in the United States. In the same year, the group formed their first sub-unit, entitled Girls' Generation-TTS, or simply "TTS," composed of members Taeyeon, Tiffany, and Seohyun. The subgroup's debut EP, Twinkle, peaked at #126 on the Billboard 200. In May, SMTown returned to California again with the SMTown Live World Tour III in Anaheim. In August, as part of their New Evolution Global Tour, 2NE1 held their first American concert in the New York Metropolitan Area at the Prudential Center of Newark, New Jersey. In November, as part of their Alive Tour, BigBang held their first solo concert in America, visiting the Honda Center in Los Angeles and the Prudential Center in Newark. The tickets sold out in only a few hours, and additional dates were added. On November 13, the American singer-songwriter Madonna and backup dancers performed "Gangnam Style" alongside Psy during a concert at Madison Square Garden in New York City. Psy later told reporters that his gig with Madonna had "topped his list of accomplishments."

On January 29, 2013, Billboard, one of America's most popular music magazines, launched Billboard K-Town, an online column on its website that covered K-pop news, artists, concerts, and chart information.

In March of that year, f(x) performed at the K-Pop Night Out at SXSW in Austin, Texas, alongside The Geeks, who represented Korean rock. f(x) was the first K-pop group ever to perform at SXSW.
Mnet hosted its Kcon event in NY and LA in July 2016.

In 2017, BTS was nominated for the Top Social Artist Award at the 2017 Billboard Music Awards. Their winning of the award marks the first time a Korean group has won a Billboard Award, and the second time a Korean artist has won the award, after Psy's win in 2013. BTS won the award at the 2017, 2018, and 2019 Billboard Music Awards, as well as Top Duo/Group in 2019. They performed at the 2017 American Music Awards and the 2018 Billboard Music Awards, making them one of the first Korean groups to have performed at either awards show. BTS's album Love Yourself: Tear reached #1 on the Billboard 200, making it the first Korean act to do so. Additionally, BTS's single "Fake Love" debuted at #10 on the Billboard Hot 100, making them the second Korean artist to chart in the top ten.

On August 21, 2020, BTS' song Dynamite debuted at number 1 on the Billboard Hot 100, making it their first ever single to top the Billboard chart. Their next single, Life Goes On, also managed to top the chart upon release on November 20, 2020.

Latin America

Many idol groups have loyal fan bases in Latin America. Since 2009, about 260 fan clubs with a total of over 20,000 and 8,000 active members have been formed in Chile and Peru, respectively.

In 2011, the United Cube Concert was held in São Paulo, shortly after the second round of the first K-Pop Cover Dance Festival was held in Brazil, with MBLAQ as judges.

In March 2012, JYJ performed in Chile and Peru. When the group arrived at the Jorge Chávez International Airport in Peru for the JYJ World Tour Concert, they were escorted by airport security officials through a private exit due to safety reasons concerning the large number of fans (over 3,000). At the Explanada Sur del Estadio Monumental in Lima, some fans camped out for days in to see JYJ. In April, Caracol TV and Arirang TV jointly aired a K-pop reality show in Colombia. In September, Junsu became the first K-pop idol to perform solo in Brazil and Mexico, after the Wonder Girls in Monterrey in 2009. The concerts sold out well in advance. That year there were 70 K-pop fan clubs in Mexico, with at least 60,000 members altogether.

In January 2014, Kim Hyung-jun performed in Peru, Chile, and Bolivia, becoming the first K-pop idol to perform in Bolivia. The tour proved his popularity in the continent as both fans and the media followed him everywhere he went, causing traffic on the roads and police to be called to maintain safety. Fans were also seen pitching their tents outside the concert venue for days before the actual concert.

Mexico 
Korean media in Mexico experienced a surge in 2002 after Mexican governor, Arturo Montiel Rojas, visited South Korea. From his trip, he brought Korean series, movies, and other programs to Mexico State's broadcasting channel: Televisión Mexiquense (channel 34). Korean dramas exposed the Mexican public to Korean products and spurred interest in other aspects of Korean culture. K-pop began to gain ground in Mexico due to the series the music accompanied. Fans particularly sought out the music of soundtracks respective to Korean dramas that were broadcast.

However, K-pop's arrival to Mexico is also attributed to the influence of Japanese media in Mexico and the introduction of PIU (Pump It Up). The comic convention, La Mole, commenced selling Japanese comics and music and later commenced to sell K-pop. PIUs combined gaming and dancing, introducing the Mexican youth to Korean gaming software and generating interest in Korean music.

K-pop's presence in Mexico can be outlined through the growing number of Korean music acts in the country. In recent years, the number of K-pop concerts in Mexico has risen and branched into other portions of the country. Idol groups, including BigBang and NU'EST, have visited Mexico through their respective world tours. JYJ's Kim Junsu became the first Korean star to perform solo. His concert held in Mexico City sold out in advance. The Music Bank World Tour also brought various acts to the Mexican public. Many of those groups covered widely known songs, such as Exo's cover of Sabor A Mi.

In 2017, Mexico also became the first Latin American country to host KCON. The two-day convention held on March 17–18 brought over 33,000 fans to Arena Ciudad de México. Much like artists during Music Bank, idols covered Spanish songs.

The strength and large number of fan clubs have continuously helped promote and support K-pop across the country. Over 70 fan clubs dedicated to Korean music are present in Mexico, bringing together around 30,000 fans. Although many fan clubs were created around 2003, they achieved a public presence in 2005 when Korea's ex-president Roh Moo Hyun visited Mexico for a meeting with Mexico's ex-president Vicente Fox Quesada. Around 30 Hallyu fan clubs held a "rally" asking Roh to bring actors Jang Dong-gun and Ahn Jae-wook to their country.

Demonstrations have continued into recent years. On May 13, 2013, a large march was held in Mexico City's Zócalo. Called KPOP: Massive March K–Pop Mexico II, it was the second mass march that brought together hundreds of avid K-Pop fans.

However, larger fan club organizations in Mexico receive indirect or direct support from Korean cultural programs. KOFICE (Korea Foundation for International Cultural Exchange) and the Korean Cultural Center, Mexico City often work in conjunction with fan clubs. These larger organizations contain multiple fan clubs within their structure. The three largest are MexiCorea, Hallyu Mexican Lovers, and HallyuMx. Both MexiCorea and Hallyu Mexican Lovers are supported by KOFICE while HallyuMx previously worked with the Korean Cultural Center and the Embassy of the Republic of Korea in Mexico.

Europe
In 2010, both the SMTown Live '10 World Tour and the Super Junior Super Show 4 Tour were held in Paris.

In February 2011, Teen Top performed at the Sala Apolo concert hall in Barcelona. In May, Rain became the first K-pop artist to perform in Germany, during the Dresden Music Festival. JYJ also performed in both Berlin and Barcelona. BigBang flew to Belfast and won the Best Worldwide Act during the 2011 MTV EMAs in Northern Ireland. In Poland, the K-pop Star Exhibition was held in the Warsaw Korean Culture Center. 

In February 2012, Beast held their Beautiful Show in Berlin. According to the Berliner Zeitung, many fans who attended were not just from Germany but also from neighbouring countries such as France and Switzerland. Also in February, the Music Bank World Tour drew more than 10,000 fans to the Palais Omnisports de Paris-Bercy. That year, artists such as Beast and 4Minute performed during the United Cube Concert in London, where the MBC Korean Culture Festival was also held. When Shinee arrived at the London Heathrow Airport for a concert at the Odeon West End in the same year, part of the airport became temporarily overrun by frenzied fans. The reservation system of the Odeon West End crashed for the first time one minute after ticket sales began as the concert drew an unexpectedly large response. At this time, Shinee also held a 30-minute performance at the Abbey Road Studio. The ticket demand for this performance was so high that fashion magazine Elle gave away forty tickets through a lottery, and the performance was also televised in Japan through six different channels. Also in 2012, BigBang won the Best Fan category in the Italian TRL Awards.

In March 2022, KPOP.FLEX took place at Deutsche Bank Park Stadium in Frankfurt, Germany. Over 65,000 fans attended from over 80 different countries.

Russia
K-pop also saw a surge in popularity in Russia. On September 6, 2011, 57 dance teams took part in the K-pop Cover Dance Festival. During the second round of the competition, Shinee flew to Moscow as judges, also performing to Russian fans. The following year, Russian youths launched K-Plus, a Korean culture magazine, and the number of Russian K-pop fans was reported at 50,000.

On February 3, 2014, Park Jung-min became the first ever Korean singer to hold a solo concert in Moscow. in club Moscow Hall 600 place with tour "Park Jung Min Reverso Tour."

B.A.P held concerts during their tour "Live On Earth 2016 World Tour" in Adrenaline Stadium and their tour "2017 World Tour 'Party Baby!'" in YotaSpace.

On June 6, 2018, Got7 performed in the concert hall Adrenaline Stadium in Moscow for their concert tour "Eyes on You."

On October 7, 2018 Zico during concert tour "King Of the Zungle" performed at the club ГЛАВCLUB Green Concert in Moscow.

On December 8, 2018, on the MTV Russia channel, the project of the mobile operator MTS, MTCamp, was launched (the acronym of their company name and the word amp and at the same time MTV Trainee Camp) the result of which is half a year should be the junior team from 5 members in the style of k-pop. The show is hosted by figure skater Evgenia Medvedeva, a fan of the Korean version of Exo, Exo-K. The show collaborates with the production company Avex Trax.

On July 15, Exo's "Power" and BTS' "Fake Love" were played at the 2018 World Cup Final Match in Russia.

In 2022, the term "K pop" was included in the French dictionary Larousse.

Middle East 
K-pop has become increasingly popular across the Middle East over recent years, particularly among younger fans. In July 2011, Israeli fans met South Korea's Ambassador to Israel, Ma Young-sam, and traveled to Paris for the SMTown Live '10 World Tour in Europe. According to Dr. Nissim Atmazgin, a professor of East Asian Studies at Hebrew University of Jerusalem, "Many young people look at K-pop as culture capital—something that makes them stand out from the crowd." As of 2012, there are over 5,000 K-pop fans in Israel and 3,000 in the Palestinian territories. Some dedicated Israeli and Palestinian fans see themselves as "cultural missionaries" and actively introduce K-pop to their friends and relatives, further spreading the Hallyu wave within their communities.

In 2012, the number of fans in Turkey surpassed 100,000, reaching 150,000 in 2013. ZE:A appeared for a fan meet-and-greet session in Dubai and a concert in Abu Dhabi. In Cairo, hundreds of fans went to the Maadi Library's stage theater to see the final round of the K-POP Korean Song Festival, organized by the Korean Embassy. In January 2018, boy group Exo was invited to Dubai, United Arab Emirates for the Dubai Fountain Show. Their single "Power" was the first K-pop song to be played at the fountain show. In 2019, boy band BTS was invited to perform at King Fahd International Stadium by Crown Prince Mohammed Bin Salman. They are the first boy band to play a solo stadium tour in Saudi Arabia.

Oceania
The K-pop Wave has led to the creation of a number of dance groups that perform dance covers of K-pop music and teach K-pop choreography. In the K-Pop World Festival competition, AO Crew has represented Australia three times—in 2013, 2014, and 2016. Also, another dance cover group, IMI Dance, was the opening show for the RapBeat Show in 2017. Several dance studios provide classes that are based on K-pop choreography. Dance group Crave NV teaches a K-pop class every Saturday at their dance studio in New Zealand. A Sydney-based agency, The academy, began offering K-pop boot camps and other programs in 2016.

A number of K-pop idols have hailed from Oceania. Australian-Korean artists include Blackpink's Rosé, ZE:A's Kevin Kim, One Way's Peter Hyun, C-Clown's Rome, Stray Kids' Bang Chan and Felix, EvoL's Hayana, and LEDapple's Hanbyul.

In 2011, the K-Pop Music Festival at the ANZ Stadium was held in Sydney, featuring Girls' Generation, TVXQ, Beast, Shinee, 4minute, Miss A, 2AM, and MBLAQ. There was also demand for concerts from New Zealand.

In August 2012, NU'EST visited Sydney Harbour and the University of New South Wales, as judges of a K-pop contest being held there. The following year, 4Minute were judges at the same contest in Sydney. In October, Psy toured Australia after his single "Gangnam Style" reached number one in Australia on the ARIA charts.

In May 2016, B.A.P held a concert in Auckland, becoming the first K-Pop group to perform in New Zealand.

KCON, an annual K-pop music and cultural convention, was launched for the first time in Australia in September 2017.  They are the seventh country to host KCON since 2012. It was held at Qudos Bank Arena, Sydney. The lineup for the event was Pentagon, Wanna One, Girl's Day, Cosmic Girls (WJSN), Exo, SF9, Victon, Monsta X, and UP10TION.

Foreign relations
On May 25, 2010, South Korea responded to the alleged North Korean sinking of a navy ship by broadcasting 4Minute's single "HuH" across the DMZ. In response, North Korea affirmed its decision to "destroy" any speakers set up along the border. That year, The Chosun Ilbo reported that the Ministry of National Defense had considered setting up large TV screens across the border to broadcast music videos by several popular K-pop girl groups such as Girls' Generation, Wonder Girls, After School, Kara and 4Minute as part of "psychological warfare" against North Korea.

In September 2012, North Korea uploaded a video with a manipulated image of South Korean president Park Geun-hye performing the dance moves of "Gangnam Style." The video labeled her as a "devoted" admirer of the Yusin system of autocratic rule set up by her father, Park Chung-hee.Since the early 2010s, several political leaders have acknowledged the global rise of Korean pop culture, most notably U.S. President Barack Obama, who made an official visit to South Korea in 2012 and mentioned the strong influences of social media networks, adding that it was "no wonder so many people around the world have caught the Korean wave, Hallyu." A few months later, U.N. Secretary-General Ban Ki-moon delivered a speech in front of the National Assembly of South Korea, where he noted South Korea's "great global success" in the fields of culture, sports and the arts, before pointing out that the Korean Wave was "making its mark on the world." This occurred a few days after U.S. State Department spokeswoman Victoria Nuland remarked in a daily press briefing that her daughter "loves Korean pop," which sparked a media frenzy in South Korea after a journalist from the country's publicly funded Yonhap News Agency arranged an interview with Nuland and described Nuland's teenage daughter as "crazy about Korean music and dance."

In November 2012, the British Minister of State for the Foreign Office, Hugo Swire, addressed a group of South Korean diplomats at the House of Lords, where he emphasized the close ties and mutual cooperation shaping South Korea–United Kingdom relations and added: "As 'Gangnam Style' has demonstrated, your music is global too." In February 2013, the Vice President of Peru, Marisol Espinoza, gave an interview with South Korea's Yonhap News Agency, where she voiced her desire for more South Korean companies to invest in her country and named K-pop as "one of the main factors that made Peruvian people wanting to get to know South Korea more."

According to an article published by the international relations magazine Foreign Policy, the spread of Korean popular culture across Southeast Asia, parts of South America, and parts of the Middle East are illustrating how the gradual cessation of European colonialism is giving way and making room for unexpected soft power outside of the Western world. On the other hand, an article published by The Quietus magazine expressed concern that discussions about Hallyu as a form of soft power seems to bear a whiff of the "old Victorian fear of Yellow Peril."

In August 2016, it was reported that China planned to ban Korean media broadcasts and K-pop idol promotions within the country in opposition to South Korea's defensive deployment of THAAD (Terminal High Altitude Area Defense) missiles. The reportage of these planned regulatory measures caused an immediate negative impact on shares in Korean talent agencies, although stock prices later recovered.

On April 1, 2018, North Korean leader Kim Jong-Un hosted a K-pop concert in Pyongyang.

See also

 Contemporary culture of South Korea
 Korean Wave (a.k.a. Hallyu)
 Korean language & Hangul
 Korean idol
 Korean hip hop
 Korean rock
 Korean ballad
 Korean drama
 Cinema of South Korea
 List of K-pop artists
 List of South Korean idol groups
 List of South Korean boy bands
 List of South Korean girl groups
 List of K-Pop concerts held outside Asia
 Music industry of East Asia
 South Korean music
 J-Pop (Japan)
 C-Pop (China)
 Taiwanese pop
 List of popular music genres

Notes

References

Bibliography

 
 
 
 
 

 
South Korean popular culture
Articles containing video clips
Pop music genres
Pop music by country
Popular music by country